Francis Brennan may refer to:
Francis Brennan (cardinal) (1894–1968), American cardinal of the Roman Catholic Church
Francis Brennan (hotelier) (born 1953), flamboyant Irish television personality
Francis Gerard Brennan (1928–2022), Australian lawyer

See also
Frank Brennan (disambiguation)